Herreriopsis is a genus of one species of flowering plants, endemic to Madagascar. In the APG III classification system, the genus is placed in the family Asparagaceae, subfamily Agavoideae (formerly the family Agavaceae). The sole species is Herreriopsis elegans.

References

Monotypic Asparagaceae genera
Agavoideae
Endemic flora of Madagascar
Taxa named by Joseph Marie Henry Alfred Perrier de la Bâthie